Craster is a small fishing village on the  Northumberland coast of England,  from Alnwick. The next village to the north is Embleton.

It  has a small harbour and offers a view northwards along the rocky shore to the ruins of Dunstanburgh Castle. This is the nearest point of access to the castle and the approach must be made on foot as there is just a grassy path.

The remains of a tower on the end of the harbour are all that can be seen now of the much taller building which was part of the overhead equipment which used to convey the local stone from where it was quarried to boats in the harbour. The disused quarry is now a car park.

A small distance inland lies Craster Tower, the home of the Craster family who owned the quarry and had the harbour improved for its benefit. A memorial on the harbour wall commemorates a member of the Craster family who died serving with the British Army in Tibet in the 19th century. The development of the harbour serves as a memorial to their son.

For many years, the village has had a herring-curing business: Craster kippers are well known around the world.

The walk along the coast to the south passes by Cullernose Point, an example of the basaltic cliffs which are a significant feature of the local landscape, and are part of the Whin Sill. It is within the Northumberland Coast Area of Outstanding Natural Beauty.

A mile to the west, Dunstan Hall is a mansion incorporating a medieval pele tower, now used as holiday accommodation.

References

External links

Northumberland Communities (Accessed: 6 November 2008)
Craster History told by the people themselves
Memorial to John Charles Pullein Craster 

Ports and harbours of Northumberland
Villages in Northumberland
Populated coastal places in Northumberland